HD 224801, also known as CG Andromedae, is an Alpha² Canum Venaticorum variable star in the constellation Andromeda.

Spectrum
CG Andromedae is also a chemically peculiar star with a strong magnetic field, or Ap star, with a spectral type A0IIspSiSrHg. This means that it's a bright giant star that shows narrow absorption lines and unusual strong lines of silicium, strontium and mercury. Calcium and manganese lines are weaker than expected instead. Other sources report that the stronger lines are of silicium and europium, thus giving a spectral classification B9pSiEu, which has just a slightly different temperature for the blackbody emission in addition to the different lines.

Variability
Like in Alpha² Canum Venaticorum variable stars, CG Andromedae shows a variation of luminosity and one in the strength of spectral lines with the same period of approximately 3.74 days. It is thought that this is caused by an inhomogeneous distribution of elements on the surface of the star, which cause an inhomogeneous surface brightness.

A shorter period, slightly longer than 2 hours, with an amplitude of 0.011 magnitudes has been observed in the light curve of CG Andromedae; however, with a temperature of 11,000 K, it lies outside the instability strip of the HR diagram where rapidly oscillating Ap stars are located. Magnetohydrodynamic waves propagating in the star could explain the observed variability.

References

Andromeda (constellation)
Alpha2 Canum Venaticorum variables
B-type main-sequence stars
Andromedae, CG
9080
224801
BD+44 4538
000063
Ap stars